Steven George Lubratich ,  (born May 1, 1955, in Oakland, California) is an American former professional baseball player who played parts of two seasons in the Major League Baseball (MLB) with the California Angels.

Playing career
Lubratich attended the University of California, Riverside, where he played college baseball for the Highlanders from 1976–1977.  He signed with the Angels as an amateur free agent in 1977. He made his MLB debut as a pinch runner on September 27, 1981, against the Toronto Blue Jays. He appeared in seven games with California that season before spending the entire 1982 season in the minors. He made it back to the majors in 1983, hitting .218 in 57 games with the Angels. Lubratich's final MLB appearance was on September 30, 1983, against the Texas Rangers.

Administrative career
Lubratich is currently director of professional scouting with the Cleveland Indians.

References

More information

1955 births
Living people
American expatriate baseball players in Canada
American people of Slavic descent
Baseball players from California
Beaumont Golden Gators players
California Angels players
Cleveland Indians executives
Cleveland Indians scouts
Detroit Tigers executives
Edmonton Trappers players
El Paso Diablos players
Idaho Falls Angels players
Las Vegas Stars (baseball) players
Major League Baseball infielders
Salt Lake City Gulls players
Salinas Angels players
San Diego Padres executives
San Diego Padres scouts
Spokane Indians managers
Spokane Indians players
UC Riverside Highlanders baseball players